The  60th Technology and Engineering Emmy Awards  was held on January 8, 2009  at the 2009 International Consumer Electronics Show in Las Vegas. CEO of  Verizon Communications, Ivan Seidenberg received the Lifetime Achievement Award

Awardees

Serial Interface and Protocols for Server/VTR control
Harris Corporation
Sony
Delivery Confirmation Systems
XOrbit
Scripps Networks
Development and Standardization of File Formats for Video and Audio
Society of Motion Picture and Television Engineers (SMPTE)
Thomson Grass Valley
Pioneering Development of MPEG-4 AVC systems for HDTV
Tandberg Television
DirecTV
Pioneering RF Combiners for Adjacent Channels on Common Antenna Systems
Harris Corporation
Micro Communications Inc. (MCI)
Radio Frequency Systems (RFS)
Ongoing live global HD cinemacasting
Metropolitan Opera Association
Developing HDMI
Silicon Image
Thomson Multimédia
Toshiba
Sony
Matsushita
Hitachi
Philips
Molex
Japan Aviation Electronics (JAE)
Intel
Standardization of the ATSC Digital System
Advisory Committee on Advanced Television Service
Advanced Television System Committee
Advanced Television Test Center
Advanced Television Evaluation Laboratory
MPEG-4 AVC Standard
Video Coding Experts Group (VCEG)
Moving Picture Experts Group (MPEG)

References

External links

Technology & Engineering Emmy Awards
2008 awards
2009 in Nevada
January 2009 events in the United States